Razpotje is a small settlement west of Izlake in the Municipality of Zagorje ob Savi in central Slovenia. The area is part of the traditional region of Upper Carniola. It is now included with the rest of the municipality in the Central Sava Statistical Region.

References

External links
Razpotje on Geopedia

Populated places in the Municipality of Zagorje ob Savi